Czech Lion Award for Best Supporting Actor is an annual award given to the best male actor in a supporting role of a Czech film.

Winners

External links

Film awards for supporting actor
Czech Lion Awards
Awards established in 1994
1994 establishments in the Czech Republic